The 1300 class were a class of diesel locomotive built by English Electric, Rocklea for Queensland Rail between 1967 and 1972. They were later sold to AN Tasrail.

History
The 1300 class was an upgraded version of the 1270 class with more powerful engines and larger fuel tanks.

The class was primarily used on the Blackwater and Moura coal lines and based at Gladstone. The class became surplus following electrification of the coal lines in 1986–1987.

In 1988, the entire class was sold to AN Tasrail where they became the ZC class. They were renumbered consecutively, 1300 becoming ZC1 and 1344 becoming ZC45, although 12 units were only used as a source of spare parts. Most had very short working lives with just 13 remaining in service by 1995 and only six by 1997.

Ten of the ZC class were sold to Morrison-Knudsen Australia in April 1994, with eight rebuilt with new cabs as the MKA class at its Whyalla factory. Two were operated on the BHP Whyalla Steelworks network from February 1995, before being exported to Senegal. MKA1-4 saw service in Malaysia before returning to Australia. These along with the unused two were purchased by Pacific National in 2004 with MKA1-3 returning to Queensland and the others to Tasmania. By 2007, all six were in service in Tasmania renumbered in the 2130 series.

With the privatisation of Australian National, AN Tasrail was sold to the Australian Transport Network, with the seven remaining ZCs becoming the 2140 class. Most stored units were scrapped and the last was withdrawn in 2004. In February 2004, Pacific National purchased Australian Transport Network, including four stored 2140 class locomotives. Chicago Freight Car Leasing Australia purchased 2142 and 2143 for a proposed tourist service, they were later sold to Senegal. In September 2009, TasRail was sold back to the Government of Tasmania. TasRail sold three of the remaining stored locos for scrap in 2012 and donated 2144 (formerly ZC19 and 1318) to Diesel Traction Tasmania, now known as Launceston & North East Railway, for preservation.

ZC 19 finally entered full preservation on the 19th of May 2021 after being trucked to L&NER’s Lilydale yard. A week shy of ZC 19’s ten year anniversary of its donation by TasRail.

Fleet summary

References

BHP Billiton diesel locomotives
Co-Co locomotives
Diesel locomotives of Queensland
Diesel locomotives of Tasmania
English Electric locomotives
Queensland Rail locomotives
Railway locomotives introduced in 1967
3 ft 6 in gauge locomotives of Australia
Diesel-electric locomotives of Australia